The Mandarin Oriental Ritz, Madrid is a historic five star Belle Époque hotel in Madrid, Spain at No. 5 in Retiro district, next to the Prado Museum. Opened in 1910, it is owned and managed by the Mandarin Oriental Hotel Group. The hotel's façade is a listed national monument.

History
The Hotel Ritz Madrid was built at the behest of King Alfonso XIII who, returning from a tour of Europe, realized that the Spanish Court lacked a hotel with enough pomp for European royalty and other illustrious visitors. His idea was for Madrid to have such a hotel to equal the likes of The Ritz London Hotel and Hôtel Ritz Paris. His own marriage to Victoria Eugenie of Battenberg was another excuse to give Madrid a luxury hotel, the first in the Spanish capital. The king himself contributed part of the capital, along with other members of Madrid society, and he instructed the Ritz Development Company that it would be designed and built under the personal supervision of César Ritz. Although Ritz initially intended to be involved in the project, he was unable to do so because of depression. Although there was an expressed desire of Alfonso XIII supporting the hotel's construction, some of the politicians of the time showed strong opposition to the project, alleging that the projected height of the building was not permitted by zoning laws for this area. Eventually, however, the project was able to proceed.

The Ritz was designed by French architect Charles Mewes and Spanish architect Luis de Landecho. It became one of the first in Madrid to use reinforced concrete in its construction. The most famous Spanish and foreign companies of the time contributed to the decoration of its rooms. Carpets were woven to order at Spain's Royal Tapestry Factory, linens were commissioned from Ireland and crockery and cutlery arrived from England.

The chosen site was once an area occupied by barracks belonging to the Hippodrome Circus and the gardens of the old Theatre Tivoli, and was formerly owned by Jardines del Buen Retiro de Madrid.  The hotel's grand opening on 2 October 1910 was officiated by King Alfonso XIII in the company of ministers and representatives of the mayor of Madrid. The hotel quickly became one of the leaders of the social and cultural life of the capital. The first board was chaired by Luis de Cuadra y Raúl Marquis de Guadalmina. The first hotel manager was Antonio Mella, who had previously managed the Ritz Hotel in Paris and London. His wife helped him in hotel management taking over guest services and laundry rooms.

Belmond sold the Ritz to Mandarin Oriental and the Saudi-based Olayan Group in May 2015 for $148 Million. Mandarin Oriental announced plans to completely renovate the hotel at a cost of $103 million. On 18 September 2018, scaffolding and part of the sixth-floor of the hotel collapsed, killing one construction worker and injuring 11 more. The hotel reopened on April 16, 2021, as Mandarin Oriental Ritz, Madrid.

Architecture and fittings

The building was designed in 1908 by French architect Charles Mewès and built in the period 1908-10 under the direction of Luis de Landecho. This was one of the first buildings in Madrid that used reinforced concrete in its construction, which was completed on 14 May 1910. Notable Spanish and foreign companies were hired to decorate the rooms. The carpets were woven in the Royal Tapestry Factory, linens was commissioned to Irish firms, the furniture was commissioned to Lissarraga y Sobrinos, and mirrors were by Pereantón. The china was by Limoges and cutlery was imported from The Goldsmiths.

Chronology
  The hotel introduced many new culinary customs such as afternoon tea. It also held dances on Tuesday evenings, when new styles such as the foxtrot became popular. Famous guests began to arrive.

Guests
Throughout its history, many famous guests have stayed at the hotel, from Ernest Hemingway to Rainier III, Prince of Monaco and his wife Grace Kelly who celebrated their honeymoon in one of its suites. Others include Ava Gardner, Michelle Pfeiffer and Madonna., Jagatjit Singh and Anita Delgado, Mata Hari, Randolph Hearst and Marion Davies, Haile Selassie.
An unwritten rule not to admit NTR (: artists, film stars or bullfighters, men without a tie -Herbert von Karajan included-, women in trousers) as hotel guests during the Marquet direction made the actor James Stewart unwelcome. However, he flashed his military badge and described himself as a colonel in the American army and therefore was admitted.

References

External links 
Mandarin Oriental Ritz, Madrid official website
official Facebook Page
official Twitter Profile

Hotels in Madrid
Hotels established in 1910
Hotel buildings completed in 1910
Art Nouveau hotels
Tourism in Madrid
Buildings and structures in Jerónimos neighborhood, Madrid
Mandarin Oriental Hotel Group
Spanish companies established in 1910
Belle Époque